The Chad Mitchell Trio, later known as The Mitchell Trio, were an American vocal group who became known during the 1960s. They performed traditional folk songs and some of John Denver's early compositions. They were particularly notable for performing satirical songs that criticized current events during the time of the Cold War, the civil rights movement, and the Vietnam War.

Chad Mitchell Trio, 1958-1965
The original group was formed in 1958, by William Chadbourne "Chad" Mitchell (from Portland, Oregon, born December 5, 1936), Mike Kobluk (from Trail, British Columbia, Canada, born December 10, 1937), and Mike Pugh (from Pasco, Washington) when they were students and glee club members at Gonzaga University in Spokane, Washington, United States. They were encouraged by Spokane Catholic priest Reinard W. Beaver, who invited the three to travel with him to New York City in the summer of 1959 and to try performing in the burgeoning folk-music scene.

The key people who helped the trio get going were musical arranger Milton Okun and star performer/singer Harry Belafonte. Okun provided a professional polish to their performing skills, which helped them gain both a key booking at New York City's Blue Angel club and radio appearances with Arthur Godfrey and television appearances with Pat Boone. Belafonte had them appear as back-up singers, with a small featured spotlight, in his May 1960 Carnegie Hall concert and signed them to his Belafonte Enterprises management firm.

In the summer of 1960, Pugh left the group to return to college. After auditioning over 150 singers, the group chose Joe Frazier (born in Lebanon, Pennsylvania, on January 14, 1937) to replace Pugh.

After recording mostly conventional folk songs, the trio released a then-daring satire of the John Birch Society (Fighting for the right to fight/The right fight for the Right!), which established their ability to perform more controversial material.  Their departure from Belafonte Enterprises in 1962, followed by their move to Mercury Records in 1963, gave them more freedom to add aggressively political songs to their body of folk, love, and world-music songs. They appeared on a variety of American TV shows, including The Bell Telephone Hour and Hootenanny.

Personnel changes and renaming, 1965-1969
Mitchell left the trio in 1965 to embark on a solo singing career. Another audition process replaced him with the young (and unknown) singer/songwriter John Denver. The group retained the well-known "Mitchell Trio" name, with Denver writing some of the group's songs.

Frazier's departure from the trio in 1966 brought in replacement David Boise. After a final live release, Kobluk left; Denver and Boise replaced Kobluk with Michael Johnson (who would later go on as a solo artist to record "Bluer Than Blue" among other popular songs) and because of contractual requirements that prohibited using the "Mitchell" name after the last original member left became "Denver, Boise and Johnson". Shortly thereafter, however, the group disbanded in 1969.

Later careers and reunions
Mike Kobluk, Joe Frazier and David Boise later left the music industry; Chad Mitchell released a number of solo albums before retiring from music; Denver's time with the trio became the springboard to his successful solo career. Michael Johnson recorded more than 15 albums as a solo artist; he died at his Minneapolis home on July 25, 2017. Frazier became an Episcopal Church priest.

The Mitchell/Kobluk/Frazier trio and John Denver reunited in 1987 for several concerts, some broadcast on PBS. These are the only recordings of all four members singing together.

The Mitchell/Kobluk/Frazier trio reunited again in 2005 for a short program as part of a concert also featuring Tom Paxton and The Kingston Trio's current lineup in Minneapolis, Minnesota.  Mitchell/Kobluk/Frazier reunited again for a one-night performance on October 6, 2007, in Spokane, home of their alma mater, and where Mitchell and Kobluk live about two blocks apart. They continue to tour with artists like Tom Paxton and performed for President Obama at a 40th anniversary celebration in Washington D.C. for Representative Dave Obey, who is a fan of the group. Concerts in 2009 were part of a 50th Anniversary tour that culminated with a benefit in Big Bear Lake, California, in December.

Joe Frazier died in his sleep on March 28, 2014, at the age of 77.

The trio of Chad Mitchell and Mike Kobluk augmented by group bassist Ron Greenstein performed their farewell concert on November 15, 2014, at the venue Bethesda Blues & Jazz in Bethesda, Maryland.

Featured personnel 
Other featured musicians for the trio through the years included:
Jim McGuinn (who later founded The Byrds and took the name Roger McGuinn): Guitar, banjo
Paul Prestopino: Guitar, 12 string guitar, banjo, and mandolin.
Bob Hefferan: Guitar
Pete Soloway: Acoustic bass
Dennis Collins: Guitar
Vic Messer: Guitar
Bill Lee: Bass
Fred Hellerman: Guitar
Erik Darling: Banjo
Jacob Ander: Guitar
Bruce Langhorne: Guitar
Norman Keenan: Bass
Clyde Lombardi: Bass
John Frigo: Bass
Jim Atlas: Bass
Ron Greenstein: Bass and vocals

Songs
The Trio's first recordings for Colpix were similar to the conventional folk songs that were gaining popularity then as an alternative to the early rock-and-roll genre. It was songs from their first Kapp Records release — "Mighty Day" (about the 1900 Galveston, Texas hurricane); "Rum By Gum" (about the Temperance/Prohibition movement); and "Lizzie Borden" (an irreverent satire countering the common heroizing of the accused axe murderer) — which began to make the Trio distinct.

Their next Kapp album contained "The John Birch Society". "The Ides of Texas" from their final Kapp release took aim at financier Billie Sol Estes.

Their live performance album At The Bitter End on Kapp Records also included the song "Moscow Nights" with its original Russian lyrics, despite the Cold War era of strained relations between the U.S. and the U.S.S.R.

The trio's Mercury albums continued its trend to record topical and controversial songs. "Twelve Days" imagined a group of former Nazis singing new lyrics to the old Christmas carol;  a similar theme would be explored later in the "I Was Not A Nazi Polka". "Barry's Boys" ("You too can join the crew/Tippecanoe and Nixon, too") portrayed a view of the followers of conservative Republican 1964 Presidential candidate Barry Goldwater. "A Dying Business" went after funeral costs and customs, while "The Draft Dodger Rag" (by Phil Ochs: "Sarge, I'm only eighteen/I got a ruptured spleen/And I always carry a purse") explored the beginnings of resistance to the Vietnam War. "What Kind of Life Is That" pondered on celebrity fame (specifically, that of Elizabeth Taylor). "Alma Mater" ("We'll miss the classrooms/Where we learned/And effigies we burned") took on segregationist policies at the University of Mississippi and was followed later by "Your Friendly, Liberal, Neighborhood Ku-Klux-Klan."

While the Mitchell Trio became best known for such songs, they also produced a solid body of work which showed that folk music could be "polished" yet remain close to its roots. They recorded shanties numbers like "Whup Jamboree" and "The Golden Vanity", as well as folk dance numbers like "Hello Susan Brown". They could do rousing gospel music numbers like "You Can Tell The World", "I Feel So Good About It (Sin Bound Train)", and "One Day When I Was Lost (Easter Morn)". They were the first folk group to record many of the songs of Tom Paxton, such as "The Marvelous Toy", "What Did You Learn In School Today?", and "We Didn't Know". They also sang the work of Woody Guthrie ("The Great Historical Bum (Bragging Song)"), Shel Silverstein ("The Hip Song (It Does Not Pay To Be Hip)", "Three Legged Man"), and Bob Dylan ("Blowin' in the Wind" (they were in fact the first to release it, but Peter, Paul and Mary's subsequent rendition became the best-known version), "With God On Our Side", "Mr. Tambourine Man").

The Mitchell Trio also did the first major recording of John Denver's later hit "For Baby (For Bobbi)" and also handled his "Leaving on a Jet Plane". Their final album offered a soft, harmonized version of The Beatles' "She Loves You". Kobluk's solo vocal on "The First Time Ever I Saw Your Face" pre-dated the Roberta Flack major hit version by several  years.

Influence and legacy
Johnny Cash cited their version of "Four Strong Winds" as a stylistic influence and included it on his Artist's Choice album of favorites. The 2003 mockumentary A Mighty Wind featured The Folksmen, a group described "as a more leftish variation on the Chad Mitchell Trio."

Discography

Albums
Chad Mitchell, Mike Kobluk, Mike Pugh:
 The Chad Mitchell Trio (Colpix, 1959; reissued 1964 as The Chad Mitchell Trio Arrives!)
 In Concert - Everybody's Listening (Colpix, 1964;  pre-1960 recordings of the Trio on Side One only, with Side Two featuring "The Gatemen")

Chad Mitchell, Mike Kobluk, Joe Frazier:
 Mighty Day on Campus (Kapp, 1961) #39
 At the Bitter End (Kapp, 1962) #81
 In Action (Kapp, 1962;  re-issued as Blowin' in the Wind) #87
 The Best Of (Kapp, 1963) #63
 Singin' Our Minds (Mercury, 1963) #39
 Reflecting (Mercury, 1964) #29
 Slightly Irreverent (Mercury, 1964) #128
 Typical American Boys (Mercury, 1965) #130
 The George Bush Society (No Label, 2008)

Mike Kobluk, Joe Frazier, John Denver:
 That's the Way It's Gonna Be (Mercury, Aug 1965)
 Violets of Dawn (Mercury, Dec 1965)
 Beginnings (Mercury, 1974) sub-titled, John Denver with the Mitchell Trio

Mike Kobluk, John Denver, David Boise:
 Alive! (Reprise, 1967;  final album of 'original' career)

Chad Mitchell solo
 Chad Mitchell/Himself (Warner Bros, 1966)
 Love, A Feeling Of (Warner Bros, 1967)
 Chad (Bell, 1969)
 Virgo Moon (Silver City, 1991)

Reunion albums:
 Mighty Day; The Chad Mitchell Trio Reunion (Folk Era, 1994)
 The Chad Mitchell Reunion... Part 2 (Folk Era, 1997)

Singles

DVDs:
 "Mighty Day" The Chad Mitchell Trio Reunion (1987)
 The Chad Mitchell Trio - Then & Now (3 disc DVD set)

References

Sources
 The Mitchell Trio Song Book (Robert Shelton, editor/writer;  Walter Rain, music editor;  Quadrangle Books, Chicago, 1964 [Library Of Congress Catalog Card Number 64-24290] )

External links
Official Chad Mitchell Trio Web Site

American folk musical groups
American musical trios
Colpix Records artists
Kapp Records artists
Mercury Records artists
Musical groups established in 1958
Musical groups disestablished in 1967
Musical groups established in 2005
Musical groups disestablished in 2014
Musical groups from Spokane
Reprise Records artists
1958 establishments in Washington (state)
1967 disestablishments in Washington (state)
2005 establishments in Washington (state)
2014 disestablishments in Washington (state)